The 1969 Soviet Football Championship of the Class A Second Group was the seventh season of the Class A Second Group that was established in 1963. It was also the 29th season of the Soviet second tier league competition. The season started on April 1, 1969, with the Round 1 games in Group 4. The season ended with the last round of the Final stage played on November 6, 1969.

In August of 1969, Karpaty Lvov won the Football Cup of the Soviet Union (a parallel elimination tournament), thus qualifying for the 1970–71 European Cup Winners' Cup. Karpaty became the only Soviet team of masters that qualified for the continental competition while playing in the second tier of the Soviet football league pyramid.

Format
The competition involved participation of 87 clubs split in four groups by geographic principle with 2 groups consisting of only teams only from Russian SFSR, one group consisting of teams from Ukrainian SSR, and the other group involved teams from other union republics of the Soviet Union. Three groups conducted their competitions in simple double round-robin format, while one group was split in two subgroups which had double round-robin format and after that each subgroup was split in half with best teams from each playing with best teams of other subgroup, and worst teams from each subgroup playing with worst teams of other subgroup. At the end all winners from each of the four groups qualified for the final stage where teams played each other in single round-robin tournament. The best team out of 87 received promotion to the 1970 Class A Top Group (predecessor of the Top League).

For the next season, the Class A Second Group was to be renamed as the Class A First Group and its composition reduced. For that reason, only 18 teams preserved their place for the next season with 68 teams being either relegated or withdrawn.

First stage

Subgroup 1 (Russia)

Teams

Promoted
 Dinamo Bryansk
 Spartak Belgorod
 Mashuk Pyatigorsk

Renamed
 Avtomobilist Nalchik was called Spartak Nalchik

Subgroup 1 table

Subgroup 2 (Russia)

Teams

Promoted
 Kalininets Sverdlovsk

Renamed
 Dinamo Barnaul was called Temp Barnaul

First Zone

Second Zone

For places 1-12

For places 13-24

Subgroup 3 (Ukraine)

Teams

Promoted
 Bukovina Chernovtsy
 Avangard Ternopol
 Desna Chernigov
 Shakhter Kadievka
 Dinamo Khmelnitskiy

Renamed
 Stroitel Poltava was called Selstroi Poltava

Subgroup 3 table

Subgroup 4 (Union rep)

Teams

Relegated
 Dinamo Kirovobad

Promoted
 Spartak Brest

Subgroup 4 table

Number of teams by republics

Final stage

For places 1-4
 [Oct 31 - Nov 6, Simferopol]

See also
 Soviet First League

External links
 1969 season. RSSSF
 1969 season (second tier). fc-dynamo.ru
 1969 season Group 1 (second tier). teams.by
 1969 season Group 2 (second tier). teams.by
 1969 season Group 3 (second tier). teams.by
 1969 season Group 4 (second tier). teams.by
 1969 season Final (second tier). teams.by
 1969 season (second tier). footballfacts.ru

1969
2
Soviet
Soviet